Ruggero Trevisan (born 12 March 1990) is a former Italian rugby union player who played as a fullback.

After Aironi collapsed because of financial problems, Trevisan moved to the Italian franchise Zebre, along with many of the Aironi team.

References

External links
http://www.itsrugby.co.uk/player-16863.html

1990 births
Living people
Italian rugby union players
People from Latisana
Aironi players
Zebre Parma players
Rugby union fullbacks
Sportspeople from Friuli-Venezia Giulia